Ulverton is the first novel by British author Adam Thorpe.  The work recounts 300 years of history in the fictional village of Ulverton, stylistically representing the literary eras of the day.  The novel won the Winifred Holtby Memorial Prize in 1992.

References

1992 British novels
Historical novels
Secker & Warburg books